Kim Chae-won is the name of:

 Kim Chae-won (writer) (born 1946), South Korean writer
 Kim Chae-won (singer, born 1997), South Korean singer, former member of April
 Kim Chae-won (singer, born 2000), South Korean singer, member of Le Sserafim and former member of Iz*One